Charles III (Charles Philip Arthur George; born 14 November 1948) is King of the United Kingdom and the 14 other Commonwealth realms. He was the longest-serving heir apparent and Prince of Wales, and at the age of 73, became the oldest person to accede to the British throne, upon the death of his mother, Elizabeth II, on 8 September 2022.

Charles was born in Buckingham Palace during the reign of his maternal grandfather, King George VI, and was three when his mother acceded to the throne in 1952, making him the heir apparent. He was made Prince of Wales in 1958 and his investiture was held in 1969. He was educated at Cheam and Gordonstoun schools, as was his father, Prince Philip, Duke of Edinburgh. Charles later spent six months at the Timbertop campus of Geelong Grammar School in Victoria, Australia. After earning a Bachelor of Arts degree from the University of Cambridge, Charles served in the Air Force and Navy from 1971 to 1976. In 1981, he married Lady Diana Spencer, with whom he had two sons: William and Harry. In 1996, the couple divorced after they had each engaged in well-publicised extramarital affairs. Diana died in a car crash the following year. In 2005, Charles married his long-term partner, Camilla Parker Bowles.

As heir apparent, Charles undertook official duties and engagements on behalf of his mother. He founded the youth charity the Prince's Trust in 1976, sponsors the Prince's Charities, and is a patron, president, or a member of over 400 other charities and organisations. He has advocated for the conservation of historic buildings and the importance of architecture in society. A critic of modernist architecture, Charles worked on the creation of Poundbury, an experimental new town based on his architectural tastes. He is also an author or co-author of over 20 books.
An environmentalist, Charles supported organic farming and action to prevent climate change during his time as the manager of the Duchy of Cornwall estates, earning him awards and recognition from environmental groups; he is also a prominent critic of the adoption of genetically modified food, while his support for homeopathy and other alternative medicine has been criticised.

Charles's coronation is scheduled to take place on 6 May 2023.

Early life, family and education 

Charles was born at 21:14 (GMT) on 14 November 1948, during the reign of his maternal grandfather, King George VI. He was the first child of Princess Elizabeth, Duchess of Edinburgh (later Queen Elizabeth II), and Philip, Duke of Edinburgh. His parents had three more children, Anne (born 1950), Andrew (born 1960) and Edward (born 1964). On 15 December 1948, at four weeks old, he was christened in the Music Room of Buckingham Palace by the Archbishop of Canterbury, Geoffrey Fisher.

In February 1952, upon the death of his grandfather and the accession of his mother as Elizabeth II, Charles became the heir apparent. Under a charter of King Edward III in 1337, and as the monarch's eldest son, he automatically assumed the traditional titles of the Duke of Cornwall and, in the Scottish peerage, the titles Duke of Rothesay, Earl of Carrick, Baron of Renfrew, Lord of the Isles, and Prince and Great Steward of Scotland. On 2 June 1953, Charles attended his mother's coronation at Westminster Abbey.

When Charles turned five, a governess, Catherine Peebles, was appointed to oversee his education at Buckingham Palace. On 7 November 1956, Charles commenced classes at Hill House School in west London. He was the first heir apparent to attend school rather than be educated by a private tutor. He did not receive preferential treatment from the school's founder and headmaster, Stuart Townend, who advised the Queen to have Charles train in football because the boys were never deferential to anyone on the football field. Charles then attended two of his father's former schools, Cheam Preparatory School in Hampshire, England, from 1958, followed by Gordonstoun in the north-east of Scotland, beginning classes there in April 1962.

In Charles's 1994 authorised biography by Jonathan Dimbleby, Elizabeth and Philip were described as physically and emotionally distant parents, and Philip was blamed for his disregard of Charles's sensitive nature and forcing him to attend Gordonstoun, where he was bullied. Though Charles reportedly described Gordonstoun, noted for its especially rigorous curriculum, as "Colditz in kilts", he subsequently praised Gordonstoun, stating it had taught him "a great deal about myself and my own abilities and disabilities. It taught me to accept challenges and take the initiative." In a 1975 interview, he said he was "glad" he had attended Gordonstoun and that the "toughness of the place" was "much exaggerated". He spent two terms in 1966 at the Timbertop campus of Geelong Grammar School in Victoria, Australia, during which time he visited Papua New Guinea on a school trip with his history tutor, Michael Collins Persse. In 1973, Charles described his time at Timbertop as the most enjoyable part of his whole education. Upon his return to Gordonstoun, Charles emulated his father in becoming head boy. He left in 1967 with six GCE O-levels and two A-levels in history and French, at grades B and C respectively. On his early education, Charles later remarked, "I didn't enjoy school as much as I might have, but that was only because I'm happier at home than anywhere else."

Charles broke royal tradition a second time when he proceeded straight to university after his A-levels, rather than joining the British Armed Forces. In October 1967, he was admitted to Trinity College, Cambridge, where he read archaeology and anthropology for the first part of the Tripos, and then changed to history for the second part. During his second year, Charles attended the University College of Wales in Aberystwyth, studying Welsh history and language for a term. He graduated from the University of Cambridge with a 2:2 Bachelor of Arts (BA) degree on 23 June 1970, the first British heir apparent to earn a university degree. As per tradition, on 2 August 1975, his BA was promoted to a Master of Arts (MA Cantab) degree: at Cambridge, Master of Arts is not a postgraduate degree.

Prince of Wales 

Charles was created Prince of Wales and Earl of Chester on 26 July 1958, though his investiture was not held until 1 July 1969, when he was crowned by his mother in a televised ceremony held at Caernarfon Castle. He took his seat in the House of Lords in 1970, and he made his maiden speech in June 1974, the first royal to speak from the floor since the future Edward VII in 1884. He spoke again in 1975. Charles began to take on more public duties, founding the Prince's Trust in 1976, and travelling to the United States in 1981. In the mid-1970s, Charles expressed an interest in serving as governor-general of Australia, at the suggestion of Australian prime minister Malcolm Fraser, but because of a lack of public enthusiasm nothing came of the proposal. Charles commented: "So, what are you supposed to think when you are prepared to do something to help and you are just told you're not wanted?"

Military training and career 
Charles served in the Royal Air Force and, following in the footsteps of his father, grandfather and two of his great-grandfathers, in the Royal Navy. During his second year at Cambridge, he requested and received Royal Air Force training, learning to fly the Chipmunk aircraft with Cambridge University Air Squadron. On 8 March 1971, he flew himself to the Royal Air Force College Cranwell to train as a jet pilot. He was presented with his RAF wings in August 1971. After the passing-out parade that September, he embarked on a naval career and enrolled in a six-week course at the Royal Naval College Dartmouth. He gave up flying after crash-landing a BAe 146 in Islay in 1994, for which the crew was found negligent by a board of inquiry.

On 9 February 1976, Charles took command of the coastal minehunter  for his last ten months of active service in the navy. In 1978, he took part in a parachute training course at RAF Brize Norton after being appointed colonel-in-chief of the Parachute Regiment a year earlier.

Relationships and marriages

Bachelorhood 
In his youth, Charles was amorously linked to a number of women. His great-uncle Lord Mountbatten advised him:

Charles's girlfriends included Georgiana Russell, the daughter of Sir John Russell, who was British ambassador to Spain; Lady Jane Wellesley, the daughter of the 8th Duke of Wellington; Davina Sheffield; Lady Sarah Spencer; and Camilla Shand, who later became his second wife.

Early in 1974, Mountbatten began corresponding with 25-year-old Charles about a potential marriage to Amanda Knatchbull, Mountbatten's granddaughter. Charles wrote to Amanda's mother, Lady Brabourne, who was also his godmother, expressing interest in her daughter. Lady Brabourne replied approvingly, though she suggested that a courtship with a 16-year-old was premature. Four years later, Mountbatten arranged for Amanda and himself to accompany Charles on his 1980 tour of India. Both fathers, however, objected; Philip feared that Charles would be eclipsed by his famous uncle, while Lord Brabourne warned that a joint visit would concentrate media attention on the cousins before they could decide on becoming a couple. However, in August 1979, before Charles would depart alone for India, Mountbatten was assassinated by the Irish Republican Army. When Charles returned, he proposed to Amanda, but in addition to her grandfather, she had lost her paternal grandmother and youngest brother in the bomb attack and was now reluctant to join the royal family. In June 1980, Charles officially turned down Chevening House, placed at his disposal since 1974, as his future residence. Chevening, a stately home in Kent, was bequeathed, along with an endowment, to the Crown by the last Earl Stanhope, Amanda's childless great-uncle, in the hope that Charles would eventually occupy it. In 1977, a newspaper report mistakenly announced his engagement to Princess Marie-Astrid of Luxembourg.

Lady Diana Spencer 

Charles first met Lady Diana Spencer in 1977 while he was visiting her home, Althorp. He was the companion of her elder sister, Sarah, and did not consider Diana romantically until mid-1980. While Charles and Diana were sitting together on a bale of hay at a friend's barbecue in July, she mentioned that he had looked forlorn and in need of care at the funeral of his great-uncle Lord Mountbatten. Soon, according to Charles's chosen biographer, Jonathan Dimbleby, "without any apparent surge in feeling, he began to think seriously of her as a potential bride", and she accompanied Charles on visits to Balmoral Castle and Sandringham House.

Charles's cousin Norton Knatchbull and his wife told Charles that Diana appeared awestruck by his position and that he did not seem to be in love with her. Meanwhile, the couple's continuing courtship attracted intense attention from the press and paparazzi. When Prince Philip told him that the media speculation would injure Diana's reputation if Charles did not come to a decision about marrying her soon, and realising that she was a suitable royal bride (according to Mountbatten's criteria), Charles construed his father's advice as a warning to proceed without further delay.

Charles proposed to Diana in February 1981 and their engagement became official on 24 February. They married in St Paul's Cathedral on 29 July of that year. Upon his marriage, Charles reduced his voluntary tax contribution from the profits generated by the Duchy of Cornwall from 50% to 25%. The couple lived at Kensington Palace and at Highgrove House, near Tetbury, and had two children: Princes William (b. 1982) and Henry (known as "Harry") (b. 1984). Charles set a precedent by being the first royal father to be present at his children's births.

Within five years, the marriage was in trouble due to the couple's incompatibility and near 13-year age difference. By November 1986, Charles had fully resumed his affair with Camilla Parker Bowles (née Shand). In a videotape recorded by Peter Settelen in 1992, Diana admitted that by 1986, she had been "deeply in love with someone who worked in this environment." It is thought she was referring to Barry Mannakee, who was transferred to the Diplomatic Protection Squad in 1986 after his managers had determined that his relationship with Diana had been inappropriate. Diana later commenced a relationship with Major James Hewitt, the family's former riding instructor. Charles and Diana's evident discomfort in each other's company led to them being dubbed "The Glums" by the press. Diana exposed Charles's affair with Camilla in a book by Andrew Morton, Diana: Her True Story. Audio tapes of her own extramarital flirtations also surfaced. Persistent suggestions that Hewitt is Prince Harry's father have been based on a physical similarity between Hewitt and Harry. However, Harry had already been born by the time Diana's affair with Hewitt began.

In December 1992, British prime minister John Major announced the couple's legal separation in Parliament. In early 1993, the British press published transcripts of a passionate bugged telephone conversation between Charles and Camilla from 1989, which was dubbed "Camillagate" and "Tampongate" by the press. Charles sought public understanding in a television film, Charles: The Private Man, the Public Role, with Jonathan Dimbleby that was broadcast on 29 June 1994. In an interview in the film, he confirmed his own extramarital affair with Camilla, saying that he had rekindled their association in 1986 only after his marriage to Diana had "irretrievably broken down". This was followed by Diana's own admission of marital troubles in an interview with the BBC current affairs show Panorama, broadcast on 20 November 1995. Referring to Charles's relationship with Camilla, she said: "Well, there were three of us in this marriage, so it was a bit crowded." She also expressed doubt about her husband's suitability for kingship. Charles and Diana divorced on 28 August 1996, after being formally advised by the Queen in December 1995 to end the marriage. The couple shared custody of their children. Diana was killed in a car crash in Paris on 31 August of the following year; Charles flew to Paris with Diana's sisters to accompany her body back to Britain.

Camilla Parker Bowles 

The engagement of Charles and Camilla Parker Bowles was announced on 10 February 2005; he presented her with an engagement ring that had belonged to his grandmother Queen Elizabeth The Queen Mother. The Queen's consent to the marriage (as required by the Royal Marriages Act 1772) was recorded in a Privy Council meeting on 2 March. In Canada, the Department of Justice announced its decision that the Queen's Privy Council for Canada was not required to meet to give its consent to the marriage, as the union would not result in offspring and would have no impact on the succession to the Canadian throne.

Charles was the only member of the royal family to have a civil rather than a church wedding in England. Government documents from the 1950s and 1960s, published by the BBC, stated that such a marriage was illegal, though these were dismissed by Charles's spokesman, and explained to be obsolete by the sitting government.

The marriage was scheduled to take place in a civil ceremony at Windsor Castle, with a subsequent religious blessing at St George's Chapel. The venue was subsequently changed to Windsor Guildhall, because a civil marriage at Windsor Castle would oblige the venue to be available to anyone who wished to be married there. Four days before the wedding, it was postponed from the originally scheduled date of 8 April until the following day in order to allow Charles and some of the invited dignitaries to attend the funeral of Pope John Paul II.

Charles's parents did not attend the civil marriage ceremony; the Queen's reluctance to attend possibly arose from her position as Supreme Governor of the Church of England. The Queen and the Duke of Edinburgh did attend the service of blessing and later held a reception for the newlyweds at Windsor Castle. The blessing, by the Archbishop of Canterbury, Rowan Williams, at St George's Chapel, Windsor Castle, was televised.

Official duties 

In 2008, The Daily Telegraph described Charles as the "hardest-working member of the royal family". He carried out 560 official engagements in 2008, 499 in 2010, and over 600 in 2011.

During his time as Prince of Wales, Charles undertook official duties on behalf of the Queen. He officiated at investitures and attended the funerals of foreign dignitaries. Charles made regular tours of Wales, fulfilling a week of engagements each summer, and attending important national occasions, such as opening the Senedd. The six trustees of the Royal Collection Trust met three times a year under his chairmanship.

In 1970, Charles visited Bermuda to mark the Parliament of Bermuda's 350th anniversary. In his speech to parliament and referring to the actions of Charles I, Charles joked, "Bearing in mind I am the first Charles to have anything to do with a Parliament for 350 years, I might have turned nasty and dissolved you". Charles also represented the Queen at the independence celebrations in Fiji in 1970, the Bahamas in 1973, Papua New Guinea in 1975, Zimbabwe in 1980, and Brunei in 1984.

In 1981 he became the patron of the Canadian Warplane Heritage Museum. In 1983, Christopher John Lewis, who had fired a shot with a .22 rifle at the Queen in 1981, attempted to escape a psychiatric hospital in order to assassinate Charles, who was visiting New Zealand with his first wife, Diana, and son William. While Charles was visiting Australia on Australia Day in January 1994, David Kang fired two shots at him from a starting pistol in protest of the treatment of several hundred Cambodian asylum seekers held in detention camps. In 1995, Charles became the first member of the royal family to visit the Republic of Ireland in an official capacity. In 1997, Charles represented the Queen at the Hong Kong handover ceremony. At the ceremony, he read the Queen's message to Hong Kongers, which said: "Britain is part of Hong Kong's history and Hong Kong is part of Britain's history. We are also part of each other's future".

In 2000, Charles revived the tradition of the Prince of Wales having an official harpist, in order to foster Welsh talent at playing the harp, the national instrument of Wales. At the funeral of Pope John Paul II in 2005, Charles unintentionally caused controversy when he shook hands with the president of Zimbabwe, Robert Mugabe, who had been seated next to him. Charles's office subsequently released a statement saying: "The Prince of Wales was caught by surprise and not in a position to avoid shaking Mr Mugabe's hand. The Prince finds the current Zimbabwean regime abhorrent. He has supported the Zimbabwe Defence and Aid Fund, which works with those being oppressed by the regime. The Prince also recently met Pius Ncube, the Archbishop of Bulawayo, an outspoken critic of the government."

Charles represented the Queen at the opening ceremony of the 2010 Commonwealth Games in Delhi, India. He has attended official events in the United Kingdom in support of Commonwealth countries, such as the Christchurch earthquake memorial service at Westminster Abbey in 2011. From 15 to 17 November 2013, he represented the Queen for the first time at a Commonwealth Heads of Government Meeting, in Colombo, Sri Lanka.

In 2013, Charles donated an unspecified sum of money to the British Red Cross Syria Crisis appeal and DEC Syria appeal, which is run by 14 British charities to help victims of the Syrian civil war. According to The Guardian, it is believed that after turning 65 years old in 2013, Charles donated his state pension to an unnamed charity that supports elderly people. In March 2014, Charles arranged for five million measles-rubella vaccinations for children in the Philippines on the outbreak of measles in South-East Asia. According to Clarence House, Charles was affected by news of the damage caused by Typhoon Yolanda in 2013. International Health Partners, of which he has been Patron since 2004, sent the vaccines, which are believed to protect five million children below the age of five from measles.

Letters sent by Charles to government ministers during 2004 and 2005 – the so-called black spider memos – presented potential embarrassment following a challenge by The Guardian newspaper to release the letters under the Freedom of Information Act 2000. In March 2015, the Supreme Court of the United Kingdom decided that Charles's letters must be released. The letters were published by the Cabinet Office on 13 May 2015. Reaction to the memos upon their release was largely supportive of Charles, with little criticism of him. The memos were variously described in the press as "underwhelming" and "harmless" and that their release had "backfired on those who seek to belittle him", with reaction from the public also supportive. In 2015, it was revealed that Charles had access to confidential UK cabinet papers.

Charles and Camilla made their first joint trip to the Republic of Ireland in May 2015. The trip was called an important step in "promoting peace and reconciliation" by the British Embassy. During the trip, Charles shook hands in Galway with Gerry Adams, leader of Sinn Féin and widely believed to be the leader of the IRA, the militant group that had murdered Charles's relatives in a 1979 terror attack. The Galway event was described by the media as a "historic handshake" and a "significant moment for Anglo-Irish relations". In the run up to Charles's visit, two Irish republican dissidents were arrested for planning a bomb attack. Semtex and rockets were found at the Dublin home of suspect Donal Ó Coisdealbha, member of a self-styled Óglaigh na hÉireann organisation, who was later jailed for five and a half years. He was connected to a veteran republican, Seamus McGrane of County Louth, a member of the Real IRA, who was jailed for 11 and a half years.

Charles made frequent visits to Saudi Arabia in order to promote arms exports for companies such as BAE Systems. In 2013, 2014, and 2015, he met with the commander of Saudi Arabia's National Guard Mutaib bin Abdullah. In February 2014, he took part in a traditional sword dance with members of the Saudi royal family at the Janariyah festival in Riyadh. At the same festival, British arms company BAE Systems was honoured by Prince Salman bin Abdulaziz. Charles was criticised by Scottish MP Margaret Ferrier in 2016 over his role in the sale of Typhoon fighter jets to Saudi Arabia. According to Charles's biographer Catherine Mayer, a Time magazine journalist who claims to have interviewed several sources from Charles's inner circle, he "doesn't like being used to market weaponry" in deals with Saudi Arabia and other Arab Gulf states. According to Mayer, Charles has only raised his objections to being used to sell weapons abroad in private.
Commonwealth heads of government decided at their 2018 meeting that Charles would be the next Head of the Commonwealth after the Queen. The head is chosen and therefore not hereditary.

On 7 March 2019, the Queen hosted a Buckingham Palace event to mark the 50th anniversary of Charles's investiture as Prince of Wales. Guests at the event included the Duchess of Cornwall, the Duke and Duchess of Cambridge, the Duke and Duchess of Sussex, Prime Minister Theresa May and Welsh first minister Mark Drakeford. The same month, at the request of the British government, Charles and Camilla went on an official tour to Cuba, making them the first British royalty to visit the country. The tour was seen as an effort to form a closer relationship between the UK and Cuba.

In January 2020, Charles became the first British patron of the International Rescue Committee, a charity which aims to help refugees and those displaced by war, persecution, or natural disaster. In April 2021 and following a surge in COVID-19 cases in India, Charles issued a statement, announcing the launch of an emergency appeal for India by the British Asian Trust, of which he is the founder. The appeal, called Oxygen for India, helped with buying oxygen concentrators for hospitals in need.

On 25 March 2020, it was announced that Charles had contracted COVID-19 during the pandemic. He and his wife subsequently isolated at their Birkhall residence. Camilla was also tested but returned a negative result. Clarence House stated that he showed "mild symptoms" but "remains in good health". They further explained, "It is not possible to ascertain from whom the prince caught the virus owing to the high number of engagements he carried out in his public role during recent weeks." Several newspapers were critical that Charles and Camilla were tested promptly at a time when many NHS doctors, nurses and patients had been unable to be tested expeditiously. On 30 March 2020, Clarence House announced that Charles had recovered from the virus, and that, after consulting his doctor, he was no longer isolating. Two days later, he stated in a video that he would continue to practise social distancing.

In October 2020, a letter sent by Charles to Australian governor-general John Kerr after the 1975 dismissal from office of Prime Minister Gough Whitlam was released as a part of the collection of palace letters regarding the 1975 Australian constitutional crisis. In the letter, Charles appeared to be supportive of Kerr's decision, writing that what Kerr "did last year was right and the courageous thing to do – and most Australians seemed to endorse your decision when it came to the point," adding that he should not worry about "demonstrations and stupidities" that arose following his decision.

In November 2021, Charles attended the ceremonies held to mark Barbados's transition into a parliamentary republic, which removed the Queen as Barbadian head of state. Charles was invited by Prime Minister Mia Mottley as the future head of the Commonwealth, and it was the first time that a member of the royal family attended the transition of a realm to a republic.

On 10 February 2022, it was announced that Charles had tested positive for COVID-19 for a second time and was self-isolating. His wife later also confirmed contracting the virus, followed by the Queen herself 10 days after Charles's second diagnosis. Charles and his wife had received doses of a COVID-19 vaccine in February 2021.

In May 2022, Charles attended the State Opening of Parliament and delivered the Queen's Speech on behalf of his mother as a counsellor of state. In June 2022, The Times reported that Charles had privately described the UK Government's Rwanda asylum plan as "appalling" and feared that it would overshadow the June Commonwealth Heads of Government meeting in Rwanda, where Charles represented the Queen. It was later reported that cabinet ministers had warned Charles to avoid making political comments, as they feared a constitutional crisis could arise if he continued to make such statements once he became king.

Reign

Polling 
On his accession to the throne, The Statesman reported an opinion poll that put Charles's popularity with the British people at 42%. A 2018 BMG Research poll found that 46% of Britons wanted Charles to abdicate immediately upon accession to the throne, in favour of William. However, a 2021 opinion poll reported that 60% of the British public had a favourable opinion of him. More recent polling suggested that his popularity increased sharply after he became king.

Accession and coronation plans 

Charles acceded to the British throne on 8 September 2022, following his mother's death. Charles was the longest-serving British heir apparent, having surpassed Edward VII's record of 59 years on 20 April 2011. When he became monarch at the age of 73, he was the oldest person to do so, the previous record holder being William IV, who was 64 when he became king in 1830.

Plans for Charles's coronation have been made for many years, under the code name Operation Golden Orb. Reports before his accession suggested that Charles's coronation would be simpler and smaller in scale than his mother's in 1953, with the ceremony expected to be "shorter, smaller, less expensive and more representative of different faiths and community groups – falling in line with the King's wish to reflect the ethnic diversity of modern Britain". Nonetheless, the coronation will be a Church of England ceremony and will require a coronation oath, the anointment, the delivery of the orb and the enthronement.

There had been speculation throughout his mother's reign as to what regnal name Charles would choose upon his succession to the throne. Instead of Charles III, he could have chosen to reign as George VII, or used one of his other given names. It was reported that he might use George in honour of his grandfather George VI and to avoid associations with previous royals named Charles. Charles's office said in 2005 that no decision had yet been made. This speculation continued for a few hours following the death of Queen Elizabeth II, until Clarence House confirmed that Charles would use the regnal name "Charles III".

Charles gave his first speech to the nation on 9 September at 18:00 BST, in which he paid tribute to his mother and announced the appointment of his elder son, William, as Prince of Wales.

On 10 September 2022, Charles was publicly proclaimed King of the United Kingdom by the Accession Council. The ceremony was televised for the first time. Attendees included the new queen consort, Camilla; William, Prince of Wales; Prime Minister Liz Truss; and her predecessors John Major, Tony Blair, Gordon Brown, David Cameron, Theresa May, and Boris Johnson. Charles was proclaimed king of each of his other realms by the relevant privy or executive council.

The coronation of Charles III and Camilla is due to take place on 6 May 2023 at Westminster Abbey.

Philanthropy and charity 
Since founding the Prince's Trust with his £7,500 of severance pay from the Navy in 1976, Charles has established 16 more charitable organisations and now serves as president of all of those. Together, these form a loose alliance called the Prince's Charities, which describes itself as "the largest multi-cause charitable enterprise in the United Kingdom, raising over £100 million annually ... [and is] active across a broad range of areas including education and young people, environmental sustainability, the built environment, responsible business and enterprise and international."

In 2010, the Prince's Charities Canada was established in a similar fashion to its namesake in the UK. Charles is also patron of over 400 other charities and organisations. He uses his tours of Canada as a way to help draw attention to youth, the disabled, the environment, the arts, medicine, the elderly, heritage conservation, and education. In Canada, Charles has supported humanitarian projects. Along with his two sons, he took part in ceremonies that marked the 1998 International Day for the Elimination of Racial Discrimination. Charles has also set up the Prince's Charities Australia, which is based in Melbourne. The Prince's Charities Australia is to provide a coordinating presence for Charles's Australian and international charitable endeavours.

Charles was one of the first world leaders to express strong concerns about the human rights record of Romanian dictator Nicolae Ceaușescu, initiating objections in the international arena, and subsequently supported the FARA Foundation, a charity for Romanian orphans and abandoned children.

In December 2022, Charles contributed to a £1m fund with a "substantial personal donation" for a project organised by the Felix Project charity to provide hundreds of fridges and freezers for food banks. In the aftermath of Elizabeth II's death, Charles asked for the money donated in her memory to be given to the Fuel Bank Foundation, a charity that "provides vouchers for pre-payment meters for gas and electricity." In February 2023, he and Camilla donated to the Disasters Emergency Committee (DEC) which was helping victims of the 2023 Turkey–Syria earthquake.

Investigations of donations 

In 2021 and 2022, two of Charles's charities, the Prince's Foundation and the Prince of Wales's Charitable Fund, came under scrutiny for accepting donations that were deemed inappropriate by the media. In August 2021, it was announced that the Prince's Foundation was launching an investigation into the reports that middlemen took cuts for setting up dinners involving wealthy donors and Charles, at that time Prince of Wales, with prices as high as £100,000 and the fixers taking up to 25% of the fees. After temporarily stepping down, Charles's aide Michael Fawcett resigned from his role as chief executive of the Prince's Foundation in November 2021, following reports that he had fixed a CBE for Saudi businessman Mahfouz Marei Mubarak bin Mahfouz who donated more than £1.5 million to royal charities contrary to section 1 of the Honours (Prevention of Abuses) Act 1925. Charles gave Mahfouz his Honorary CBE at a private ceremony in the Blue Drawing Room at Buckingham Palace in November 2016, though the event was not published in the Court Circular. Clarence House responded that Charles had "no knowledge of the alleged offer of honours or British citizenship on the basis of donation to his charities and fully supports the investigation". The auditing firm EY, which carried out the investigation, published a summary report in December 2021, stating that Fawcett had co-ordinated with "fixers", but there was "no evidence that trustees at the time were aware of these communications". The Charity Commission launched its own investigation into allegations that the donations meant for the Prince's Foundation had been instead sent to the Mahfouz Foundation. In 2021, the foundation was also criticised for accepting a £200,000 donation from Russian convict, Dmitry Leus, whom Charles thanked in a letter, and a £500,000 donation from Taiwanese fugitive Bruno Wang. The donations by the Russian convict led to an investigation by the Scottish Charity Regulator. In February 2022 the Metropolitan Police launched an investigation into the cash-for-honours allegations linked to the foundation. On 31 October 2022, the Metropolitan Police passed their evidence to the Crown Prosecution Service for deliberation.

In June 2022, The Times reported that between 2011 and 2015 Charles accepted €3 million in cash from the prime minister of Qatar, Hamad bin Jassim bin Jaber Al Thani. The funds were said to be in the form of €500 notes, handed over in person in three tranches, in a suitcase, holdall and carrier bags. Charles's meetings with Al Thani did not appear in the Court Circular. Coutts collected the cash and each payment was deposited into the accounts of the Prince of Wales's Charitable Fund. There is no evidence that the payments were illegal or that it was not intended for the money to go to the charity. The Charity Commission announced they would review the information, and in July 2022, they announced that they would not be launching an investigation into the donations as the information submitted had provided "sufficient assurance" that due diligence had taken place. In the same month, The Times reported that the Prince of Wales's Charitable Fund received a donation of £1 million from Bakr bin Laden and Shafiq bin Laden, both half-brothers of Osama bin Laden, during a private meeting in 2013. Charles and Bakr bin Laden had known each other since 2000. The Charity Commission described the decision to accept donations as a "matter for trustees" and added that based on the available information no investigation was required. In June 2022, a senior palace aide said that cash donations would no longer be accepted.

Personal interests

Built environment 
Charles has openly expressed his views on architecture and urban planning; he fostered the advancement of New Classical Architecture and asserted that he "care[s] deeply about issues such as the environment, architecture, inner-city renewal, and the quality of life." In a speech given for the 150th anniversary of the Royal Institute of British Architects (RIBA) on 30 May 1984, he memorably described a proposed extension to the National Gallery in London as a "monstrous carbuncle on the face of a much-loved friend" and deplored the "glass stumps and concrete towers" of modern architecture. He asserted that "it is possible, and important in human terms, to respect old buildings, street plans and traditional scales and at the same time not to feel guilty about a preference for facades, ornaments and soft materials," called for local community involvement in architectural choices, and asked: 

Charles's book and BBC documentary A Vision of Britain (1987) were also critical of modern architecture, and he has continued to campaign for traditional urbanism, human scale, restoration of historic buildings, and sustainable design, despite criticism in the press. Two of his charities (the Prince's Regeneration Trust and the Prince's Foundation for Building Community, which were later merged into one charity) promote his views, and the village of Poundbury was built on land owned by the Duchy of Cornwall to a master plan by Léon Krier under the guidance of Charles and in line with his philosophy.

Charles helped establish a national trust for the built environment in Canada after lamenting, in 1996, the unbridled destruction of many of the country's historic urban cores. He offered his assistance to the Department of Canadian Heritage in creating a trust modelled on Britain's National Trust, a plan that was implemented with the passage of the 2007 Canadian federal budget. In 1999, Charles agreed to the use of his title for the Prince of Wales Prize for Municipal Heritage Leadership, awarded by the Heritage Canada Foundation to municipal governments that have shown sustained commitment to the conservation of historic places. While visiting the United States and surveying the damage caused by Hurricane Katrina, Charles received the National Building Museum's Vincent Scully Prize in 2005, for his efforts in regard to architecture; he donated $25,000 of the prize money towards restoring storm-damaged communities.

From 1997, Charles has visited Romania to view and highlight the destruction of Orthodox monasteries and Transylvanian Saxon villages during the Communist rule of Nicolae Ceaușescu. Charles is patron of the Mihai Eminescu Trust, a Romanian conservation and regeneration organisation, and has purchased a house in Romania. Historian Tom Gallagher wrote in the Romanian newspaper România Liberă in 2006 that Charles had been offered the Romanian throne by monarchists in that country; an offer that was reportedly turned down, but Buckingham Palace denied the reports. Charles also has "a deep understanding of Islamic art and architecture", and has been involved in the construction of a building and garden at the Oxford Centre for Islamic Studies that combine Islamic and Oxford architectural styles.

Charles has occasionally intervened in projects that employ architectural styles such as modernism and functionalism. In 2009, Charles wrote to the Qatari royal family, the developers of the Chelsea Barracks site, labelling Lord Rogers's design for the site "unsuitable". Subsequently, Rogers was removed from the project and the Prince's Foundation for the Built Environment was appointed to propose an alternative. Rogers claimed the Prince had also intervened to block his designs for the Royal Opera House and Paternoster Square, and condemned Charles's actions as "an abuse of power" and "unconstitutional". Lord Foster, Zaha Hadid, Jacques Herzog, Jean Nouvel, Renzo Piano, and Frank Gehry, among others, wrote a letter to The Sunday Times complaining that the Prince's "private comments" and "behind-the-scenes lobbying" subverted the "open and democratic planning process". Piers Gough and other architects condemned Charles's views as "elitist" in a letter encouraging colleagues to boycott a speech given by Charles to RIBA in 2009. CPC Group, the developer of the project, took a case against Qatari Diar to the High Court, which described Charles's intervention as "unwelcome". After the case was settled, the CPC Group apologised to him "for any offence caused by the decision to commence litigation against Qatari Diar and the allegations made by CPC during the course of the proceedings".

In 2010, the Prince's Foundation for the Built Environment decided to help reconstruct and redesign buildings in Port-au-Prince, Haiti after the capital was destroyed by the 2010 Haiti earthquake. The foundation is known for refurbishing historic buildings in Kabul, Afghanistan and Kingston, Jamaica. The project has been called the "biggest challenge yet" for the Prince's Foundation for the Built Environment. For his work as patron of New Classical Architecture, in 2012 Charles was awarded the Driehaus Architecture Prize for patronage. The prize, awarded by the University of Notre Dame, is considered the highest architecture award for New Classical Architecture and urban planning.

Livery company commitments 
The Worshipful Company of Carpenters installed Charles as an Honorary Liveryman "in recognition of his interest in London's architecture." Charles is also Permanent Master of the Worshipful Company of Shipwrights, a Freeman of the Worshipful Company of Drapers, an Honorary Freeman of the Worshipful Company of Musicians, an Honorary Freeman and Liveryman of the Worshipful Company of Stationers and Newspaper Makers, an Honorary Member of the Court of Assistants of the Worshipful Company of Goldsmiths, and a Royal Liveryman of the Worshipful Company of Gardeners.

Natural environment 

Since the 1970s, Charles has promoted environmental awareness. At the age of 21, he delivered his first speech on environmental issues in his capacity as the chairman of the Welsh Countryside Committee. In order to decrease his carbon footprint, he has used biomass boilers for heating Birkhall, where he has also installed a hydroelectric turbine in the river beside the estate. He has utilised solar panels at Clarence House and Highgrove, and – besides using electric cars on his estates – runs his Aston Martin DB6 on E85. An avid gardener, Charles has also emphasised the importance of talking to plants, stating that "I happily talk to the plants and trees, and listen to them. I think it's absolutely crucial". His interest in gardening began in 1980 when he took over the Highgrove estate. His "healing garden", based on sacred geometry and ancient religious symbolism, went on display at the Chelsea Flower Show in 2002.

Upon moving into Highgrove House, Charles developed an interest in organic farming, which culminated in the 1990 launch of his own organic brand, Duchy Originals, which now sells more than 200 different sustainably produced products, from food to garden furniture; the profits (over £6 million by 2010) are donated to the Prince's Charities. His organic interest extends beyond farming into landscaped spaces and Highgrove House practices organic lawn management to increase biodiversity. Documenting work on his estate, Charles co-authored (with Charles Clover, environment editor of The Daily Telegraph) Highgrove: An Experiment in Organic Gardening and Farming, published in 1993, and offers his patronage to Garden Organic. Along similar lines, Charles became involved with farming and various industries within it, regularly meeting with farmers to discuss their trade. Although the 2001 foot-and-mouth epidemic in England prevented Charles from visiting organic farms in Saskatchewan, he met the farmers at Assiniboia town hall. In 2004, he founded the Mutton Renaissance Campaign, which aims to support British sheep farmers and make mutton more attractive to Britons. His organic farming has attracted media criticism: According to The Independent in October 2006, "the story of Duchy Originals has involved compromises and ethical blips, wedded to a determined merchandising programme." A prominent critic of the practice, Charles III has also spoken against the use of GM crops and in a letter to British prime minister Tony Blair in 1998, Charles criticised the development of genetically modified foods. He repeated the same sentiments in 2008, arguing that having "one form of clever genetic engineering after another then … will be guaranteed to cause the biggest disaster environmentally of all time."

In 2007, Charles received the tenth annual Global Environmental Citizen Award from the Harvard Medical School's Center for Health and the Global Environment, the director of which, Eric Chivian, stated: "For decades the Prince of Wales has been a champion of the natural world ... He has been a world leader in efforts to improve energy efficiency and in reducing the discharge of toxic substances on land, and into the air and the oceans". Charles's travels by private jet drew criticism from Plane Stupid's Joss Garman.

In 2007, Charles launched the Prince's May Day Network, which encourages businesses to take action on climate change. Speaking to the European Parliament on 14 February 2008, he called for European Union leadership in the war against climate change. During the standing ovation that followed, Nigel Farage, the leader of the United Kingdom Independence Party (UKIP), remained seated and went on to describe Charles's advisers as "naive and foolish at best." In a speech to the Low Carbon Prosperity Summit in a European Parliament chamber on 9 February 2011, Charles said that climate change sceptics are playing "a reckless game of roulette" with the planet's future and are having a "corrosive effect" on public opinion. He also articulated the need to protect fisheries and the Amazon rainforest, and to make low-carbon emissions affordable and competitive. In 2011, Charles received the Royal Society for the Protection of Birds Medal for his engagement with the environment, such as the conservation of rainforests.

On 27 August 2012, Charles addressed the International Union for Conservation of Nature – World Conservation Congress, supporting the view that grazing animals are needed to keep soils and grassland productive:

I have been particularly fascinated, for example, by the work of a remarkable man called Allan Savory, in Zimbabwe and other semi arid areas, who has argued for years against the prevailing expert view that is the simple numbers of cattle that drive overgrazing and cause fertile land to become desert. On the contrary, as he has since shown so graphically, the land needs the presence of feeding animals and their droppings for the cycle to be complete so that soils and grassland areas stay productive. Such that, if you take grazers off the land and lock them away in vast feedlots, the land dies.

In February 2014, Charles visited the Somerset levels to meet residents affected by winter flooding. During his visit, Charles remarked that "There's nothing like a jolly good disaster to get people to start doing something. The tragedy is that nothing happened for so long." He pledged a £50,000 donation, provided by the Prince's Countryside Fund, to help families and businesses. In December 2015, Charles delivered a speech at the opening ceremony for COP21, making a plea to industries to put an end to practices that cause deforestation. In August 2019, it was announced that Charles had collaborated with British fashion designers Vin and Omi to produce a line of clothing made out of nettles found in his Highgrove estate. Nettles are a type of plant which are usually "perceived to have no value". The Highgrove plant waste was also used to create the jewellery worn with the dresses. In September 2020, Charles launched RE:TV, an online platform featuring short films and articles on issues such as climate change and sustainability. He serves as the platform's editor-in-chief. The platform later partnered with Amazon Prime Video and WaterBear, another streaming platform dedicated to environmental issues. In the same month, he stated in a speech that a military-style response similar to the Marshall Plan was required to combat climate change.

In January 2020, Charles launched the Sustainable Markets Initiative at the World Economic Forum's annual meeting in Davos, a project which encourages putting sustainability at the centre of all activities. In May 2020, his Sustainable Markets Initiative and the World Economic Forum launched the Great Reset project, a five-point plan concerned with enhancing sustainable economic growth following the global recession caused by the COVID-19 pandemic. In January 2021, Charles launched Terra Carta ("Earth Charter"), a sustainable finance charter that would ask its signatories to follow a set of rules towards becoming more sustainable and make investments in projects and causes that help with preserving the environment. In July 2021, Charles and Jony Ive announced the Terra Carta Design Lab, a competition conceived by the Royal College of Art to find solutions to climate change and environmental issues, winners of which would be supported financially and introduced to the industry leads of the Sustainable Markets Initiative. In September 2021, he launched the Food for the Future initiative, a programme with contributions from Jimmy Doherty and Jamie Oliver which aims to educate secondary school children about the food system and eliminating food waste. In his role as patron of the National Hedgelaying Society, Charles has hosted receptions for the organisation's rural competition at his Highgrove estate to assist with preserving hedgerows planted in the UK.

In June 2021, Charles attended a reception hosted by the Queen during the 47th G7 summit, and a meeting between G7 leaders and sustainable industry CEOs to discuss governmental and corporate solutions to environmental problems. In October 2021, he delivered a speech at the 2021 G20 Rome summit, describing COP26 as "the last chance saloon" for preventing climate change and asking for actions that would lead to a green-led sustainable economy. In his speech at the opening ceremony for COP26, he repeated his sentiments from the previous year, stating that "a vast military-style campaign" was needed "to marshal the strength of the global private sector" for tackling climate change.

In 2021, Charles spoke to the BBC about the environment and said two days a week he eats no meat nor fish and one day a week he eats no dairy products. In 2022, it was reported that he eats a breakfast of fruit salad, seeds and tea. He does not eat lunch, but takes a break for tea at 5 p.m. and eats dinner at 8:30 p.m. and then returns to work until midnight or after. Ahead of Christmas dinner 2022, Charles confirmed to animal rights group PETA that foie gras would not be served at any royal residences. As Prince of Wales, he had stopped the use of foie gras at his own properties for more than a decade before taking the throne.

Charles, who is patron of the Cambridge Institute for Sustainability Leadership, launched the Climate Action Scholarships for students from small island nations in partnership with University of Cambridge, University of Toronto, University of Melbourne, McMaster University and University of Montreal in March 2022. In September 2022, Charles hosted the Global Allergy Symposium at Dumfries House with the Natasha Allergy Research Foundation and 16 allergy experts from around the world to discuss factors behind new emerging allergies, including biodiversity loss and climate change. In October 2022, it was reported that British prime minister Liz Truss had advised the King against attending COP27, to which he had agreed.

Alternative medicine 

Charles has controversially championed alternative medicine. He first expressed his interest in alternative medicine publicly in December 1982 in an address to the British Medical Association (BMA). This speech was seen as 'combative' and 'critical' of modern medicine, and was met with anger by some medical professionals. The Prince's Foundation for Integrated Health (FIH) attracted opposition from the scientific and medical community over its campaign encouraging general practitioners to offer herbal and other alternative treatments to National Health Service patients. In June 2004, during a speech to healthcare professionals at a conference, he advocated using Gerson therapy treatments, such as coffee enemas, to treat cancer patients and said he knew of a terminally ill cancer patient who was cured with them. He said: "I know of one patient who turned to Gerson Therapy having been told that she was suffering from terminal cancer, and would not survive another course of chemotherapy. Happily, seven years later she is alive and well." These comments drew criticism from medical professionals such as Michael Baum. In May 2006, Charles made a speech at the World Health Assembly in Geneva, urging the integration of conventional and alternative medicine and arguing for homeopathy.

In April 2008, The Times published a letter from Edzard Ernst, Professor of Complementary Medicine at the University of Exeter, which asked the FIH to recall two guides promoting alternative medicine, saying "the majority of alternative therapies appear to be clinically ineffective, and many are downright dangerous." A speaker for the FIH countered the criticism by stating: "We entirely reject the accusation that our online publication Complementary Healthcare: A Guide contains any misleading or inaccurate claims about the benefits of complementary therapies. On the contrary, it treats people as adults and takes a responsible approach by encouraging people to look at reliable sources of information ... so that they can make informed decisions. The foundation does not promote complementary therapies." That year, Ernst published a book with Simon Singh, mockingly dedicated to "HRH the Prince of Wales", called Trick or Treatment: Alternative Medicine on Trial. The last chapter is highly critical of Charles's advocacy of complementary and alternative treatments.

Charles's Duchy Originals produced a variety of complementary medicinal products including a "Detox Tincture" that Edzard Ernst denounced as "financially exploiting the vulnerable" and "outright quackery". In 2009, the Advertising Standards Authority criticised an email that Duchy Originals had sent out to advertise its Echina-Relief, Hyperi-Lift and Detox Tinctures products saying that it was misleading. Charles personally wrote at least seven letters to the Medicines and Healthcare products Regulatory Agency (MHRA) shortly before they relaxed the rules governing labelling of such herbal products, a move that has been widely condemned by scientists and medical bodies. In October 2009, it was reported that Charles had personally lobbied the Health Secretary, Andy Burnham, regarding greater provision of alternative treatments in the NHS.

In April 2010, following accounting irregularities, a former official at the FIH and his wife were arrested for fraud believed to total £300,000. Four days later, the FIH announced its closure, claiming that it "has achieved its key objective of promoting the use of integrated health." The charity's finance director, accountant George Gray, was convicted of theft totalling £253,000 and sentenced to three years in prison. The FIH was re-branded and re-launched later in 2010 as The College of Medicine, of which Charles became a patron in 2019. In 2016, Charles said in a speech that he used homeopathic veterinary medicines to reduce antibiotic use at his farm. He drew criticism after becoming a patron of the Faculty of Homeopathy on 27 June 2019.

Sports 
From his youth until 1992, Charles was an avid player of competitive polo. He continued to play informally, including for charity, until 2005. He was occasionally injured after falling off horses, and underwent two operations in 1990 to fix fractures in his right arm. Charles also frequently took part in fox hunting until the sport was banned in the United Kingdom in 2005. By the late 1990s, opposition to the activity was growing when Charles's participation was viewed as a "political statement" by those who were opposed to it. The League Against Cruel Sports launched an attack against Charles after he took his sons on the Beaufort Hunt in 1999. At that time, the government was trying to ban hunting with hounds. In 2001, he broke a small bone in his left shoulder while hunting in Derbyshire.

Charles has been a keen salmon angler since youth and supports Orri Vigfússon's efforts to protect the North Atlantic salmon. He frequently fishes the River Dee in Aberdeenshire, Scotland, while he claims his most special angling memories are from his time in Vopnafjörður, Iceland. Charles is a supporter of Burnley Football Club.

Aside from hunting, Charles has also participated in target rifle competitions, representing the House of Lords in the Vizianagram Match (Lords vs. Commons) at Bisley. He became President of the British National Rifle Association in 1977.

Visual, performing and contemporary arts 
Charles is president or patron of more than 20 performing arts organisations, which include the Royal College of Music, the Royal Opera, the English Chamber Orchestra, the Philharmonia Orchestra, Welsh National Opera, and the Purcell School. In 2000, he revived the tradition of appointing harpists to the Royal Court, by appointing an Official Harpist to the Prince of Wales. As an undergraduate at Cambridge, he played the cello and has sung with the Bach Choir twice. He was a member of Dryden Society, Trinity College's drama group, and appeared in sketches and revues. Charles founded The Prince's Foundation for Children and The Arts in 2002, to help more children experience the arts first-hand. He is president of the Royal Shakespeare Company and attends performances in Stratford-Upon-Avon, supports fundraising events and attends the company's annual general meeting. He enjoys comedy, and is interested in illusionism, becoming a member of The Magic Circle after passing his audition in 1975 by performing the "cups and balls" effect. Charles has also been patron of the British Film Institute since 1978.

Charles is a keen and accomplished watercolourist who has exhibited and sold a number of his works to raise money for his charities and also published books on the subject. To mark the 25th anniversary of his investiture as the Prince of Wales in 1994, the Royal Mail issued a series of postage stamps which featured his paintings. For his 50th birthday, 50 of his watercolours were exhibited at Hampton Court Palace. In 2001, 20 lithographs of his watercolour paintings illustrating his country estates were exhibited at the Florence International Biennale of Contemporary Art. In 2016, it was estimated that he had sold lithographs of his watercolours for a total of £2 million from a shop at his Highgrove House residence. For his 70th birthday in 2018, his works were exhibited at the National Gallery of Australia. In 2022, 79 of his paintings were put on display in London. He is Honorary President of the Royal Academy of Arts Development Trust.

Charles was awarded the 2011 Montblanc de la Culture Arts Patronage Award by the Montblanc Cultural Foundation for his support and commitment to the arts, particularly in regard to young people.

On 23 April 2016, Charles appeared in a comedy sketch for the Royal Shakespeare Company's Shakespeare Live! at the Royal Shakespeare Theatre, to commemorate the 400th anniversary of William Shakespeare's death in 1616. The event was televised live by the BBC. Charles made a surprise entrance to settle the disputed delivery of Hamlet's celebrated line, "To be or not to be, that is the question".

In 2015, Charles commissioned 12 paintings of D-Day veterans, which went on display at the Queen's Gallery in Buckingham Palace during The Last of The Tide exhibition. In January 2022, he commissioned seven artists to paint portraits of seven Holocaust survivors. The paintings were exhibited at the Queen's Gallery in Buckingham Palace and at the Palace of Holyroodhouse and were featured in a BBC Two documentary titled Survivors: Portraits of the Holocaust.

Publications 

Charles is the author of several books, and has contributed a foreword or preface to books by others. He has also written, presented, or been featured in documentary films.

Religion and philosophy 

Shortly after his accession to the throne, Charles publicly described himself as "a committed Anglican Christian". The king is the supreme governor of the Church of England. He is also a member of the Church of Scotland, and he swore an oath to uphold that church immediately after he was proclaimed king in September 2022. Charles was confirmed at age 16 by Archbishop of Canterbury Michael Ramsey at Easter 1965, in St George's Chapel, Windsor Castle. He attends services at various Anglican churches close to Highgrove, and attends the Church of Scotland's Crathie Kirk with the rest of the royal family when staying at Balmoral Castle. In 2000, he served as Lord High Commissioner to the General Assembly of the Church of Scotland.

Laurens van der Post became a friend of Charles in 1977; he was dubbed his "spiritual guru" and was godfather to Charles's son, Prince William. From van der Post, Charles developed a focus on philosophy and interest in other religions. Charles expressed his philosophical views in his 2010 book, Harmony: A New Way of Looking at Our World, which won a Nautilus Book Award. Charles has visited Eastern Orthodox monasteries on Mount Athos, in Romania and in Serbia, and attended the consecration of Britain's first Syriac Orthodox cathedral, St Thomas Cathedral, Acton. In 2019, he attended the service in Rome at which Pope Francis declared the canonisation of Cardinal Newman. He also met with Eastern Church leaders in Jerusalem in 2020. The visit culminated in an ecumenical service in the Church of the Nativity in Bethlehem and a walk through the city accompanied by Christian and Muslim dignitaries. Charles is patron of the Oxford Centre for Islamic Studies at the University of Oxford, and attended the inauguration of the Markfield Institute of Higher Education, which is dedicated to Islamic studies in a multicultural context. 

In his 1994 documentary with Jonathan Dimbleby, Charles said that he wished to be seen as a "defender of faith" as king, rather than the monarch's traditional title of "Defender of the Faith", in order to respect other people's religious traditions. This attracted controversy at the time, as well as speculation that the coronation oath may be altered. He stated in 2015 that he would retain the title of "Defender of the Faith", whilst "ensuring that other people's faiths can also be practised", which he sees as a duty of the Church of England. Charles reaffirmed this theme shortly after his accession and declared that his duties as sovereign included "the duty to protect the diversity of our country, including by protecting the space for faith itself and its practice through the religions, cultures, traditions and beliefs to which our hearts and minds direct us as individuals." His inclusive multi-faith approach and his own Christian beliefs were also evident in his first Christmas message as king, broadcast on 25 December 2022.

Media image 
Since his birth, Charles has received close media attention, which increased as he matured. It has been an ambivalent relationship, largely impacted by his marriages to Diana and Camilla and their aftermath, but also centred on his future conduct as king, such as the 2014 play King Charles III. Known for expressing his opinions, when asked during an interview to mark his 70th birthday whether this would continue in the same way once he is king, he responded "No. It won't. I'm not that stupid. I do realise that it is a separate exercise being sovereign. So, of course, you know, I understand entirely how that should operate".

Described as the "world's most eligible bachelor" in the late 1970s, Charles was subsequently overshadowed by Diana. After her death, the media regularly breached Charles's privacy and printed exposés. In 2003, Diana's butler Paul Burrell published a note that he claimed had been written by Diana in 1995, in which there were allegations that Charles was "planning 'an accident' in [Diana's] car, brake failure and serious head injury" so that he could marry again. When questioned by the Metropolitan Police inquiry team as a part of Operation Paget, Charles told the authorities that he did not know about his former wife's note from 1995 and could not understand why she had these feelings.

Other people who were formerly connected with Charles have betrayed his confidence. In 1995, he obtained an injunction that prevented a former housekeeper's memoirs from being published in the United Kingdom, although they eventually sold 100,000 copies in the United States. Later, an ex-member of his household handed the press an internal memo in which Charles commented on ambition and opportunity, and which was widely interpreted as blaming meritocracy for creating a combative atmosphere in society. Charles responded: "In my view, it is just as great an achievement to be a plumber or a bricklayer as it is to be a lawyer or a doctor".

Reaction to press treatment 
In 1994, German tabloid Bild published nude photos of Charles that were taken while he was vacationing in Le Barroux. They were reportedly put up for sale for £30,000. Buckingham Palace reacted by stating that it was "unjustifiable for anybody to suffer this sort of intrusion".

In 2002, Charles, "so often a target of the press, got his chance to return fire" when addressing "scores of editors, publishers and other media executives" gathered at St Bride's Fleet Street to celebrate 300 years of journalism. Defending public servants from "the corrosive drip of constant criticism", he noted that the press had been "awkward, cantankerous, cynical, bloody-minded, at times intrusive, at times inaccurate and at times deeply unfair and harmful to individuals and to institutions." But, he concluded, regarding his own relations with the press, "from time to time we are probably both a bit hard on each other, exaggerating the downsides and ignoring the good points in each."

Charles's anguish was recorded in his private comments to Prince William, caught on a microphone during a press photo-call in 2005 and published in the national press. After a question from the BBC's royal correspondent, Nicholas Witchell, Charles muttered: "These bloody people. I can't bear that man. I mean, he's so awful, he really is."

In 2006, Charles filed a court case against The Mail on Sunday, after excerpts of his personal journals were published, revealing his opinions on matters such as the transfer of sovereignty of Hong Kong to China in 1997, in which Charles described the Chinese government officials as "appalling old waxworks". Mark Bolland, his ex-private secretary, declared in a statement to the High Court that Charles "would readily embrace the political aspects of any contentious issue he was interested in ... He carried it out in a very considered, thoughtful and researched way. He often referred to himself as a 'dissident' working against the prevailing political consensus." Jonathan Dimbleby reported that Charles "has accumulated a number of certainties about the state of the world and does not relish contradiction."

In 2006, Clive Goodman, the royal editor of the News of the World pleaded guilty to hacking the phones of staff at the Prince of Wales's residence. In 2011, Charles and Camilla were named as individuals whose confidential information was reportedly targeted or actually acquired in conjunction with the news media phone hacking scandal.

In 2015, The Independent noted that Charles would only speak to broadcasters "on the condition they have signed a 15-page contract, demanding that Clarence House attends both the 'rough cut' and 'fine cut' edits of films and, if it is unhappy with the final product, can 'remove the contribution in its entirety from the programme'." This contract stipulated that all questions directed at Charles must be pre-approved and vetted by representatives of Charles.

Guest appearances on television 
Charles has occasionally appeared on television. In 1984, he read his children's book The Old Man of Lochnagar for the BBC's Jackanory series. The UK soap opera Coronation Street featured an appearance by Charles during the show's 40th anniversary in 2000, as did the New Zealand young adult cartoon series bro'Town (2005), after he attended a performance by the show's creators during a tour of the country.

Charles was interviewed with Princes William and Harry by Ant & Dec to mark the 30th anniversary of the Prince's Trust in 2006 and in 2016 was interviewed by them again along with his sons and the Duchess of Cornwall to mark the 40th anniversary.

His saving of the Scottish stately home Dumfries House was the subject of Alan Titchmarsh's documentary Royal Restoration, which aired on TV in May 2012. Also in May 2012, Charles tried his hand at being a weather presenter for the BBC, reporting the forecast for Scotland as part of their annual week at Holyrood Palace alongside Christopher Blanchett. He injected humour in his report, asking, "Who the hell wrote this script?" as references were made to royal residences.

Residences and finance 

Clarence House, previously the residence of Queen Elizabeth The Queen Mother, was Charles's official London residence from 2003 after being renovated at a cost of £4.5 million. He previously shared Apartments 8 and 9 at Kensington Palace with his first wife, Diana, before moving to York House, St James's Palace, which remained his principal residence until 2003. As Prince of Wales, his primary source of income was generated from the Duchy of Cornwall, which owns 133,658 acres of land (around 54,090 hectares), including farming, residential, and commercial properties, as well as an investment portfolio. Highgrove House in Gloucestershire is owned by the Duchy of Cornwall, having been purchased for his use in 1980, and which Charles rents for £336,000 per annum. The Public Accounts Committee published its 25th report into the Duchy of Cornwall accounts in November 2013 noting that the duchy performed well in 2012–13, increasing its total income and producing an overall surplus of £19.1 million.

In 2007 Charles purchased a 192-acre property (150 acres of grazing and parkland, and 40 acres of woodland) in Carmarthenshire, and applied for permission to convert the farm into a Welsh home for him and the Duchess of Cornwall, to be rented out as holiday flats when the couple is not in residence. A neighbouring family said the proposals flouted local planning regulations, and the application was put on hold temporarily while a report was drafted on how the alterations would affect the local bat population. Charles and Camilla first stayed at the new property, called Llwynywermod, in June 2008. They also stay at Birkhall for some holidays, which is a private residence on the Balmoral Castle estate in Scotland, and was previously used by Queen Elizabeth The Queen Mother.

In 2016 it was reported that his estates received £100,000 a year in European Union agricultural subsidies. Since 1993 Charles has paid tax voluntarily under the Memorandum of Understanding on Royal Taxation, updated 2013. In December 2012, HM Revenue and Customs were asked to investigate alleged tax avoidance by the Duchy of Cornwall. The Duchy of Cornwall is named in the Paradise Papers, a set of confidential electronic documents relating to offshore investment that were leaked to the German newspaper Süddeutsche Zeitung. The papers show that the Duchy invested in a Bermuda-based carbon credits trading company run by one of Charles's Cambridge contemporaries. The investment was kept secret but there is no suggestion that Charles or the estate avoided UK tax.

In November 2022, the King asked for one-off payments of up to £600 to be made to royal household employees on top of their monthly salary to help them during the cost of living crisis. In January 2023 and following the Crown Estate's announcement of six new offshore wind energy lease agreements, Charles instructed the Keeper of the Privy Purse to inform the prime minister and the chancellor that he wished for the windfall to "be directed for wider public good, rather than to the Sovereign Grant."

Titles, styles, honours and arms

Titles and styles 
Charles was originally styled "His Royal Highness Prince Charles of Edinburgh".
On his mother's accession in 1952, he automatically acquired the Duchy of Cornwall as the monarch's eldest son and became known as "His Royal Highness The Duke of Cornwall". Though he continued to hold the title until his accession in 2022, this style was superseded when he was created Prince of Wales in 1958. From then on until he became king, he was generally styled "His Royal Highness The Prince of Wales". In Scotland he was styled, from his mother's accession until his own, "His Royal Highness The Duke of Rothesay" instead.

Between the death of his father in 2021 and his own accession, Charles also held the title of Duke of Edinburgh. The title merged with the Crown upon his accession to the throne.

Since his accession, Charles has been styled "His Majesty The King". When conversing with the King, the traditional etiquette is to address him initially as Your Majesty and thereafter as Sir.

Honours and military appointments 
Charles has held substantive ranks in the armed forces of a number of countries since he was commissioned as a flight lieutenant in the Royal Air Force in 1972. Charles's first honorary appointment in the armed forces was as Colonel-in-Chief of the Royal Regiment of Wales in 1969; since then, he has also been installed as Colonel-in-Chief, Colonel, Honorary Air Commodore, Air Commodore-in-Chief, Deputy Colonel-in-Chief, Royal Honorary Colonel, Royal Colonel, and Honorary Commodore of at least 32 military formations throughout the Commonwealth, including the Royal Gurkha Rifles, which is the only foreign regiment in the British army. Since 2009, Charles holds the second-highest ranks in all three branches of the Canadian Forces and, on 16 June 2012, the Queen awarded him the highest honorary rank in all three branches of the British Armed Forces, "to acknowledge his support in her role as Commander-in-Chief", installing him as Admiral of the Fleet, Field Marshal and Marshal of the Royal Air Force.

Charles has been inducted into seven orders and received eight decorations from the Commonwealth realms, and has been the recipient of 20 different honours from foreign states, as well as nine honorary degrees from universities in the United Kingdom, Australia and New Zealand.

Arms 

On his mother's death, Charles became king and therefore inherited the royal coats of arms of the United Kingdom and of Canada.

The design of his royal cypher, featuring a depiction of the Tudor crown instead of St Edward's Crown, was announced on 27 September 2022. According to the College of Arms, the Tudor crown will now be used in representations of the royal arms of the United Kingdom and on uniforms and crown badges.

As Prince of Wales, Charles used the arms of the United Kingdom differenced with a white label, and an inescutcheon of the Principality of Wales surmounted by the heir apparent's crown.

Banners, flags, and standards

As heir apparent 

The banners used by Charles whilst Prince of Wales varied depending upon location. His personal standard was the Royal Standard of the United Kingdom differenced as in his arms with a label of three points Argent, and the escutcheon of the arms of the Principality of Wales in the centre. It is used outside Wales, Scotland, Cornwall, and Canada, and throughout the entire United Kingdom when the prince is acting in an official capacity associated with the UK Armed Forces.

The personal flag for use in Wales was based upon the Royal Badge of Wales (the historic arms of the Kingdom of Gwynedd), which consist of four quadrants, the first and fourth with a red lion on a gold field, and the second and third with a gold lion on a red field. Superimposed is an escutcheon Vert bearing the single-arched coronet of the Prince of Wales.

In Scotland, the personal banner used since 1974 was based upon three ancient Scottish titles: Duke of Rothesay (heir apparent to the King of Scots), High Steward of Scotland and Lord of the Isles. The flag is divided into four quadrants like the arms of the Chief of Clan Stewart of Appin; the first and fourth quadrants comprise a gold field with a blue and silver checkered band in the centre; the second and third quadrants display a black galley on a silver field. The arms are differenced from those of Appin by the addition of an inescutcheon bearing the tressured lion rampant of Scotland; defaced by a plain label of three points Azure to indicate the heir apparent.

In Cornwall, the banner was the arms of the Duke of Cornwall: "Sable 15 bezants Or", that is, a black field bearing 15 gold coins.

In 2011, the Canadian Heraldic Authority introduced a personal heraldic banner for the Prince of Wales for use in Canada, consisting of the shield of the Arms of Canada defaced with both a blue roundel of the Prince of Wales's feathers surrounded by a wreath of gold maple leaves, and a white label of three points.

As sovereign 

The Royal Standard is used to represent the King in the United Kingdom and overseas when he makes official visits. It is the royal arms in banner form undifferentiated, having been used by successive British monarchs since 1702.

Issue

Ancestry

See also 
 Cultural depictions of Charles III
 List of current monarchs of sovereign states
 List of covers of Time magazine (1960s), (1970s), (1980s), (2010s)

Notes

References

Sources

Further reading

External links
 The King at the Royal Family website
 King Charles III at the website of the Government of Canada
 
 

|-

|-

|-

|-

|-

 
1948 births
Living people
20th-century British philanthropists
20th-century English male writers
21st-century British monarchs
21st-century philanthropists
21st-century English male writers
Alumni of Aberystwyth University
Alumni of Trinity College, Cambridge
Barons Greenwich
British field marshals
British princes
Children of Elizabeth II
Deified people
Dukes of Cornwall
Dukes of Edinburgh
Dukes of Rothesay
Earls of Merioneth
English Anglicans
English environmentalists
English people of Danish descent
English people of German descent
English people of Greek descent
English people of Russian descent
English people of Scottish descent
Graduates of the Royal Air Force College Cranwell
Heads of the Commonwealth
Heads of state of Antigua and Barbuda
Heads of state of Australia
Heads of state of the Bahamas
Heads of state of Belize
Heads of state of Canada
Heads of state of Grenada
Heads of state of Jamaica
Heads of state of New Zealand
Heads of state of Papua New Guinea
Heads of state of Saint Kitts and Nevis
Heads of state of Saint Lucia
Heads of state of Saint Vincent and the Grenadines
Heads of state of the Solomon Islands
Heads of state of Tuvalu
Heirs to the British throne
Wales
Honorary air commodores
House of Windsor
Marshals of the Royal Air Force
Monarchs of the Isle of Man
Monarchs of the United Kingdom
Mountbatten-Windsor family
People educated at Cheam School
People educated at Geelong Grammar School
People educated at Gordonstoun
People educated at Hill House School
People from Westminster
People of the National Rifle Association
People named in the Paradise Papers
Philanthropists from London
Princes of the United Kingdom
Princes of Wales
Royal Navy admirals of the fleet
Sustainability advocates
Writers from London
Sons of monarchs